Jean Larrouy (5 October 1907 – 28 July 1977) was a French gymnast. He competed in seven events at the 1928 Summer Olympics.

References

1907 births
1977 deaths
French male artistic gymnasts
Olympic gymnasts of France
Gymnasts at the 1928 Summer Olympics
Place of birth missing